Mitromorpha macphersonae is a species of sea snail, a marine gastropod mollusk in the family Mitromorphidae.

Description

Distribution
This marine species is endemic to Australia and occurs in the Bass Strait, and off Tasmania and Victoria

References

 Gabriel, Charles J. "Mollusca from south east of King Island, Bass Strait." Memoirs of the National Museum of Victoria 22 (1956): 1–16.

External links
 

macphersonae
Gastropods described in 1956
Gastropods of Australia